Pipe Dreams is a 1916 American short comedy film featuring Oliver Hardy.

Cast
 Kate Price as Maggie
 Oliver Hardy as Babe (as Babe Hardy)
 Joe Cohen as Butler
 Edna Reynolds as Maid

See also
 List of American films of 1916
 Oliver Hardy filmography

References

External links

1916 films
American silent short films
American black-and-white films
1916 comedy films
1916 short films
Silent American comedy films
American comedy short films
1910s American films